C. Thomas White (October 5, 1928 – December 11, 2020) was a justice of the Nebraska Supreme Court from January 6, 1977 to 1998. Initially appointed to replace retiring Judge John E. Newton, White was named chief justice on January 26, 1995, to replace retiring Chief Justice Hastings. White served as chief until his retirement in 1998.

Born in Humphrey, Nebraska, White received his law degree as valedictorian of his class from Creighton University School of Law in 1952.

White died in Omaha, Nebraska, at the age of 92.

References

1928 births
2020 deaths
Creighton University School of Law alumni
People from Platte County, Nebraska
Justices of the Nebraska Supreme Court